Israel Rodrigo Rodríguez Colman (born 21 July 1982) is a Paraguayan footballer whose last known club was Sportivo Carapeguá.

Career

International
In December 2004, Rodríguez was pushing for a call up to the Paraguay national team due to his impressive goal scoring for FC Baulmes.

Career statistics

References

External links 
Official Website

Living people
1982 births
Paraguayan footballers
FC Thun players
FC Baku players
Sportivo Luqueño players
C.S. Emelec footballers
Defensa y Justicia footballers
Azerbaijan Premier League players
Paraguayan expatriate footballers
Paraguayan expatriate sportspeople in Switzerland
Paraguayan expatriate sportspeople in Azerbaijan
Expatriate footballers in Azerbaijan
Expatriate footballers in Argentina
Expatriate footballers in Ecuador
Expatriate footballers in Switzerland
Association football forwards
Atlántida Sport Club players